Giovanni Matteo Sirtori (died 1545) was a Roman Catholic prelate who served as Bishop of Volterra (1531–1545).

Biography
On 15 November 1531, Giovanni Matteo Sirtori was appointed during the papacy of Pope Clement VII as Bishop of Volterra.
He served as Bishop of Volterra until his death in 1545.

References 

16th-century Italian Roman Catholic bishops
Bishops appointed by Pope Clement VII
1545 deaths